Joseph Daniel Votto (born September 10, 1983) is a Canadian-American professional baseball first baseman for the Cincinnati Reds of Major League Baseball (MLB). He made his MLB debut with the Reds in 2007. He is the first Canadian MLB player since Larry Walker to hit 300 home runs and have 1,000 career runs batted in (RBIs). Votto is also the second Canadian to have 2,000 hits, the first also being Walker.

Votto is a six-time MLB All-Star, a seven-time Tip O'Neill Award winner, and two-time Lou Marsh Trophy winner as Canada's athlete of the year. In 2010, he won the National League (NL) MVP Award and the NL Hank Aaron Award. Among all active players at the end of the 2018 season, he was first in career on-base percentage (.427), second in OPS (.957) and walks (1,104), and fourth in batting average (.311).

Early life
Votto was born to Wendy (née Howell) and Joseph Votto in Toronto, Ontario, and grew up in the city's borough of Etobicoke. His mother is a sommelier and restaurant manager. His father was a chef and a baseball fan who died at age 52 in 2008. He is of Italian and English descent. As a child, he adorned his wall with a Ted Williams poster.

Votto enrolled in high school at Richview Collegiate Institute in 1997. In high school, he also played basketball—playing point guard and once scoring 37 points in a game—and hockey. He played for the Etobicoke Rangers baseball program. After high school, Votto signed a National Letter of Intent to play college baseball for the Coastal Carolina Chanticleers.

Professional career

Minor leagues
The Cincinnati Reds selected Votto out of high school in the second round with the 44th overall selection of the 2002 MLB draft. While playing for the Reds' affiliate Dayton Dragons of the Class A Midwest League, he hit 26 doubles and 14 home runs with a batting average of .302. He was promoted to the Potomac Cannons of the Class A-Advanced Carolina League and hit five more home runs in 20 games to end the season with 19 round-trippers. In addition to playing first base in the minors, Votto made appearances in the outfield and as a catcher. During the 2005 campaign with the Sarasota Reds of the Class A-Advanced Florida State League, he hit 19 home runs but struck out 122 times and his batting average dropped nearly 50 points to .256.

Votto rebounded in 2006 with the best season of his minor league career. Playing for the Chattanooga Lookouts of the Class AA Southern League, he improved his batting average to .319, and hit 46 doubles and 22 home runs. He led the Southern League in batting average and total bases and was third in home runs and runs batted in (RBI). He was selected to play in the 2006 All-Star Futures Game on the World Team. He was named to both the Mid-Season and Post-Season Southern League All-Star teams, and was voted a minor league all-star by Baseball America. He culminated his season by winning the Southern League Most Valuable Player Award. During his five seasons in the minors, Votto carried Ted Williams' The Science of Hitting with him.

Later that year, Votto also played in the Dominican Winter League, playing for the Leones del Escogido team during the 2006-2007 season, shortly before starting his MLB career. He has shown respect for the Dominican league, particularly he honoured the late Dominican player Tony Fernández with a message on his cap when the former  Toronto Blue Jays member, who created pleasant memories for the Canadian fans in the 1990s, passed away in 2020.

Cincinnati Reds

2007 season
Votto started the 2007 season playing for the Louisville Bats of the Class AAA International League. The Reds promoted Votto to the major leagues on September 1, 2007. He made his major league debut on September 4, striking out against Guillermo Mota of the New York Mets. In his second major league at-bat, he hit his first career home run. He went 3-for-5 and scored two runs as the Reds won the game, 7–0. On September 8, he went 1-for-3 with a home run and three runs batted in. His three RBI were the only Reds' runs as they lost to the Milwaukee Brewers, 4–3. In his next game, he went 2-for-4. On September 14, he stole his first career base against the Brewers. He ended the season going 2-for-4 with a home run and five RBI in the Cincinnati Reds' final game of the 2007 season. He finished the season batting .321 with four home runs and 17 RBI.

2008 season

Beginning with the 2008 season, Votto shared time platooning at first base with Scott Hatteberg until manager Dusty Baker began playing Votto as the Reds' starting first baseman in early April. On April 15, he hit his first home run of the season off Michael Wuertz. He drove in a career-high five runs against the Cubs two games later. On May 7, Votto hit three home runs in a game against the Chicago Cubs.

Votto hit his first career pinch-hit home run against Cleveland's Cliff Lee, who would go on to win the AL Cy Young Award. On August 31, Votto had his first career four-hit game against the San Francisco Giants. He knocked in four runs in a 9–3 Reds victory. On September 18, Votto and teammate Jay Bruce each homered twice. They became the fifth rookie teammates in the divisional-era to hit 20 home runs in the same season.

Votto finished second in National League Rookie of the Year voting to the Chicago Cubs' Geovany Soto. He led all NL rookies in hitting (.297), hits (156), HR (24), total bases (266), multi-hit games (42), on-base percentage (.368) and slugging percentage (.506). Votto also broke the Reds' record for the most runs batted in by a rookie in a season. The previous record was held by National Baseball Hall of Fame outfielder Frank Robinson with 83 in 1956. Votto drove in 84 runs during the 2008 season.

2009 season
Votto played for Canada in the 2009 World Baseball Classic. In Canada's first game against the United States, he had four hits in five at-bats, one of which was a home run.

Votto began the 2009 season as the outright starter at first base. In the second game of the season, he went 3-for-5 with a home run and 3 RBI in a loss to the New York Mets. In the next game against the Mets, he had another homer and four RBI. He had a six-game hitting streak from April 12–18. On April 23, he went 4-for-5 with a home run and 2 runs batted in against the Cubs. He posted a .346 batting average, swatted 3 home runs, and racked up 20 RBI during the month of April.

Votto opened May with a five-game hitting streak. In a May matchup against the St. Louis Cardinals, he had two homers and four RBI. He finished the month with five home runs and a .378 batting average. However, he was placed on the DL to open June after missing time in May due to personal issues. Prior to his return game during the 2009 season, he indicated he had been suffering from depression and anxiety issues as a result of the sudden death of his father in August 2008 and had sought treatment. He had previously missed time because of dizziness related to an inner ear infection.

Votto made his return against the Toronto Blue Jays on June 23. In his third game back, he went 4-for-5 with a home run and four RBI. After going hitless in his fourth game back, he had a 14-game hitting streak. During that stretch, he batted .389 with three home runs and 14 RBI. His hitting streak ended against the Mets on July 12 when he went 0-for-2. Votto was named the National League Player of the Week for September 21–27, 2009, after hitting 10 doubles in a five-game span, a feat not accomplished in 77 years since Hall of Fame outfielder Paul Waner of the Pittsburgh Pirates in 1932. Despite missing 31 games overall, Votto finished the 2009 season among the National League leaders in batting average (.322), on-base percentage (.414) and slugging percentage (.567), and he hit 25 home runs.

2010 season: NL MVP
Votto started the 2010 season by going 3-for-5 with a home run and a run batted in. By the end of April, he had four home runs and 12 RBI. His average was .275, but his on-base percentage was .400 because of 18 bases on balls. In the month of May, he batted .344 with six home runs and 21 runs batted in. However, he missed the last six games that month because of a sore neck. He would be back on June 1 in a game against the Cardinals. He went 4-for-5 with a home run and one RBI. The Reds won the game to regain the NL Central lead.

Votto was not initially voted to the 2010 All-Star game in Anaheim, California, but he made the roster via online fan voting through the National League's Final Vote. He was named on 13.7 million of the 26 million ballots submitted. Votto went 0-for-2 in the game. On August 25, Votto went 4-for-7 with two home runs and four RBI. He also drove in the tie-breaking run with a single off Giants pitcher Barry Zito. Votto made the cover of Sports Illustrated on the August 30, 2010 edition.

On September 11, Votto hit his first career walk-off home run off Pirates relief pitcher Justin Thomas. For the season, Votto hit .324 with 113 RBI, 106 runs scored and 37 home runs, including a grand slam off Tommy Hanson of the Atlanta Braves on May 20. He finished the season leading the Major Leagues in On-Base Percentage (.424) and led the National League in Slugging Percentage (.600) and On-base plus slugging (1.024). The Reds made the postseason but lost to the Phillies in the National League Divisional Series in a three-game sweep. Votto struggled in the series, batting .100 with one run batted in.

Votto won the 2010 Hank Aaron Award in the National League. Votto was announced as the 2010 NL MVP, coming within one vote of winning unanimously as Albert Pujols received the other first-place vote. He was only the third Canadian to win the MVP award, after Larry Walker and Justin Morneau. He became the first Reds player to win the National League MVP since Barry Larkin won it in 1995. "Not to be dramatic or anything, but after I was told, I couldn't help but cry because I know how much at some point this meant to me and would have meant to my (late) father," Votto remarked after being named MVP. He added, "I did some pretty good things, and most importantly, we won. We went to the playoffs—it's been a long time since we'd been to the playoffs—and I think those all together were the reason I won."

In 2016, looking back on his MVP peak, Votto told the Cincinnati Enquirer, "Until Trout came into the league, I thought every year that I would be in the conversation for best player in the game. And he fucked that up for everybody. Babe Ruth and Ted Williams included. He’s ruining it for everyone."

2011 season

On January 16, 2011, it was announced that the Reds and Votto had agreed to a three-year, $38-million deal.

Votto homered in the Reds' first game of the 2011 season—a solo homer off Kameron Loe of the Brewers. He recorded his first four-hit game of the season against the Arizona Diamondbacks and raised his average to .455. By the end of April, he had a .370 batting average, four home runs, and 14 runs batted in. He posted a .500 on-base percentage. He began the season by reaching base in 27 consecutive games dating back to the previous season. The club record was set by Dave Collins with 34 in 1981.

On June 25, Votto hit his 100th career home run against Brian Matusz of the Orioles. He later added another home run in the game. That was also his first multi-homer game of the season. He also drove in five runs, his most in a game during the season. On July 3, Votto was voted in by the players for the 2011 All-Star Game as a reserve. He went 0-for-2 with a strikeout.

On August 28, Votto hit a walk-off home run against the Nationals in the 14th inning. On September 24, he drove in two runs against the Pirates for his 100th and 101st RBI of the season, becoming the first Reds player to drive in 100 runs in back-to-back seasons since Dave Parker in 1985–1986.

Votto finished the season with a .309 batting average, 29 home runs, and 103 RBI. He also led the NL in doubles (40), bases on balls (110), and on-base percentage (.416). On November 1, Votto won his first Gold Glove Award. He finished sixth in the NL MVP voting.

2012 season
On April 2, 2012, Votto signed a 10-year, $225 million contract extension with the Reds, which runs through the 2024 season. The deal includes the two years that remained on his previous contract and pushes the total worth of the contract to 12 years and $251.5 million—the longest active deal in baseball at the time. The deal (including the one-year team option), is the 13th-largest deal in MLB history. At the time, it was the longest guaranteed contract in MLB history. Also, the contract made Votto the highest paid athlete from Canada.

On May 13, Votto went 4-for-5 with three home runs and six RBI, including a walk-off grand slam against the Washington Nationals in a 9–6 win. It was the first time in major league history that a player hit three home runs including a walk-off grand slam in a single game.

On July 1, Votto was selected by the fans as a National League team starter in the 2012 MLB All-Star Game. At the time of his selection, he was hitting .350 with 14 home runs and 47 RBIs.

On July 16, the Reds announced that Votto would need arthroscopic knee surgery to repair a torn meniscus in his left knee and was expected to miss three to four weeks. He originally hurt the knee June 29 sliding into third base. He left the next day before the bottom of the fifth inning and missed the next two games because of inflammation in his knee. At the time surgery was announced, he was leading the NL in walks, doubles, OBP, and extra-base hits. He was second in RISP average and third in slugging percentage.

On September 5, Votto returned to the Reds' line-up in a game against the Philadelphia Phillies. In his first at-bat since July 15, he lined a single off pitcher Roy Halladay in the first inning. He would finish the game 2-for-3 with a walk. After his return from the disabled list, he struggled with his power numbers. In 25 games, he hit eight doubles and drove in seven runs, but didn't hit any home runs. He still got on base at a high clip with an OBP of .505 and walking 28 times. In that span, he also batted over .316.

Votto finished the season having played in 111 games—the fewest he had played in a season since becoming the Reds' starting first basemen in 2008. He had a .337 batting average, .474 on-base percentage, and a .567 slugging percentage to go along with 14 home runs, 56 RBI, and 44 doubles. His 94 walks led the NL. (Eighteen of his walks were intentional, which led the majors.)

2013 season
In late February, Votto was voted by fans as the "Face of the MLB," a contest that pits the "face" of every MLB team against each other and uses Twitter. He received more votes than Joe Mauer, José Bautista, Derek Jeter, Andrew McCutchen, and Matt Kemp.

Votto played for Team Canada in the 2013 World Baseball Classic.

Votto homered on consecutive days from April 20–21 against the Marlins, making it the first time since September 10–11 of 2011 he homered in consecutive games. In July, he was again voted as an All-Star starter for the 2013 Major League Baseball All-Star Game. It was his fourth All-Star appearance, and in the game, he went 0-for-2, making him a career 0-for-9 in All-Star Games.

2014 season

On May 21, 2014, Votto was placed on the 15-day disabled list with a strained left quadriceps. He returned on June 10, but he went back on the DL with the same injury on July 8 and didn't make it back before the end of the season. In 62 games played, he hit a career-low .255 with a .390 on-base percentage, .409 slugging percentage, six home runs, 47 walks, and 23 RBI.

2015 season
On May 6, 2015, Votto was ejected following a strikeout where he threw his helmet down in frustration. Speculation claimed that prior to his ejection, he had choice words with Gerrit Cole during his at-bat. After getting ejected, Votto appeared to have bumped Chris Conroy. It was only his fifth career ejection and first since 2010. He later received a one-game suspension, which he served when the Reds played the Chicago White Sox.

On June 9, Votto hit three home runs in a single game for the third time in his career in a game against the Philadelphia Phillies. The last Reds player to accomplish this feat was Barry Larkin. On August 2, Votto was ejected following a bench-clearing brawl between the Reds and the Pirates. On September 9, Votto was ejected for arguing balls and strikes. It was the third time during the season that Votto was ejected; coincidentally, all three were against the Pittsburgh Pirates. On September 11, MLB suspended Votto for two games with an option to appeal. On October 2, Votto tied a Reds record set by Pete Rose in 1978 when he got on base for his 48th straight game. In 158 games during 2015, Votto had an MLB-leading 143 walks, a .314 batting average, 29 home runs, and 80 RBI. He walked in 20.6% of his at bats (leading the major leagues), and he swung at only 19.1% of pitches outside the strike zone (the lowest percentage in the majors).

Following the season, Votto was awarded his fifth Tip O'Neill Award. He finished third in the National League MVP voting behind Bryce Harper and Paul Goldschmidt.

2016 season

After hitting a season-low .213 on May 31, Votto became the first player in MLB since Ichiro Suzuki in 2004 to hit .400 after the All-Star Break. Votto hit .408/.490/.668 in the second half, between July 15 and the season's end on October 2.

Votto's .326 season average was the second-best of his career, behind only his 2012 season, where he hit .337. Votto hit 29 home runs, second only to his 2010 MVP season.

Votto finished the season with a .326 (3rd in the NL)/.435 (leading the NL)/.550 (6th in the NL) line; he also had 108 walks, 29 home runs, and 97 RBI (10th in the NL), while playing 158 games for the second straight season. He was also among the NL league leaders in OPS (.985, 2nd), walks (T2nd), hits (8th), runs (9th), and total bases (306, 10th). He became the 10th player in Major League history to lead his league in on-base percentage at least 5 times; the only players who had done it more years were Barry Bonds (10) and Hall of Famers Ted Williams (12), Babe Ruth (10), Rogers Hornsby (9), Ty Cobb (7), Wade Boggs (6), and Stan Musial (6).

2017 season 
Votto finished the first half of the 2017 season with a slash line of .315/.427/.614 while slugging 26 home runs, which tied for the NL lead with Marlins outfielder Giancarlo Stanton. This performance earned Votto his fifth career All-Star appearance as a substitute. He was also known for his promise to buy teammate Zack Cozart a donkey for making the 2017 All-Star Game. After many interviews and an appearance in a donkey suit on MLB Network's Intentional Talk, Cozart won the fan vote and made the cut as the National League starting shortstop. Votto upheld his end of the deal, buying Cozart a donkey shortly afterward. As the second half of the season passed, the Reds continued to struggle, but Votto did just the opposite. Late in the year, Votto had a streak of consecutive games reaching base multiple times, which spanned 20 games and was the second longest in MLB history behind Ted Williams' 1948 record of 21.

He finished the year with a stat-line that consisted of a .319 batting average (4th in the NL), .578 slugging percentage (7th), 106 runs scored (6th), 36 homers (6th), and 100 runs batted in (10th). He led the league in OBP at .454, OPS (at 1.032), in walks for the fifth season (134), in walk percentage (at 19%), and in walks per strikeout (at 1.61), while leading the majors in intentional walks (20). His WAR total equalled out to 7.5, his second-highest since his year in 2015 when he had 7.6 WAR. Votto's homer total was one under his 2010 season as well. Votto became just the first Reds player since Pete Rose in 1975 to start all 162 regular season games in a season and just the fourth player in franchise history to do so. He swung at only 15.8% of pitches outside the strike zone (the lowest percentage in the majors). Among all active players at the end of the season, he was first in career on-base percentage (.428), second in OPS (.969), third in batting average (.313), fourth in walks (996), and fifth in slugging percentage (.541).

End-of-season awards for Votto included selection as first baseman on Baseball America'''s All-MLB Team and his second Lou Marsh Trophy. Votto also finished second in the National League MVP voting, narrowly losing out to Giancarlo Stanton by two votes in the fourth-closest vote in MLB history.

 2018 season 

With eight home runs and 44 RBIs, Votto was named to the 2018 MLB All-Star Game. For the season, he batted .284/.417 /.419. For the third year running, he led the National League in on-base percentage. He swung at only 16.4% of pitches outside the strike zone (the lowest percentage in the majors).

With his seventh season leading the NL in on-base percentage, Votto became the sixth player in major league history to lead their league in the category seven or more times, following Ted Williams (12), Barry Bonds and Babe Ruth (10 each), and Ty Cobb and Rogers Hornsby (seven each).

 2019 season 

In 2019, Votto batted .261/.357/.411 with 15 home runs and 47 RBIs. He swung at the lowest percentage of pitches outside the strike zone of all National League batters (21.1%), and had the lowest Soft Contact Percentage of all major league batters, at 10.1%. Dubiously, he hit a pop-out to first base for the first time in his career on April 17 (which was his 6,829th plate appearance).

 2020 season 

On September 20, Votto drew the 1,211th walk of his career, passing Pete Rose for the most in Reds history.

In the pandemic-shortened 2020 regular season, Votto appeared in 53 games. He had 223 plate appearances and batted .226/.354/.446 with 11 home runs and 22 runs batted in. He was the ninth-oldest player in the National League.

 2021 season 

On April 30, Votto hit his 300th career home run, a go-ahead home run in the bottom of the third inning versus the Chicago Cubs. On June 19, Votto was ejected for arguing a checked swing third strike call during a game against the San Diego Padres. He needed to be restrained by the Reds' coaching staff during the argument, and later received a two-game suspension and an undisclosed fine for his conduct. The suspension was later reduced to one game after an appeal. Votto served his suspension during a game against the Minnesota Twins on June 22. 

On June 30, Votto hit a home run against Joe Musgrove of the San Diego Padres, notching his 1,000th career RBI of his professional career with the Reds. He is one of five Reds players to have driven in 1,000 runs in a professional career. On July 30, in a game against the New York Mets, Votto hit a home run, which marked his seventh straight game with a home run alongside setting a club record for most games with a home run. The streak ended the next night when he failed to hit a home run, falling one short of tying the league record for most consecutive games with a home run, though Votto became the oldest player to hit nine home runs in seven games. He was named NL Player of the Month for the month of July 2021. On August 16, Votto collected his 2,000th career hit, a single off Chicago Cubs reliever Michael Rucker.

Votto finished the 2021 season hitting .266 with 36 home runs and 99 RBI. In 2021, he posted the lowest percentage of softly hit balls among all major leaguers, at 8.0%.

2022 season
Votto's 2022 season was hampered by injuries and an especially poor start to the year. He underwent season-ending surgery to repair a torn left rotator cuff on August 19, 2022. Votto said the injury dated back to 2015 but strength training had enabled him to play through the discomfort. He finished with career worsts in batting average, on-base percentage and slugging percentage.

After his surgery, Votto guested in the Reds' television broadcast booth several times during the remainder of the season.

Player profile
Through the end of 2022, he had a career .297 batting average, 342 home runs, and 1,106 runs batted in.  He led the NL in bases on balls with 110 in 2011; despite missing 51 games in 2012, he led the NL in that category. His career on-base percentage (OBP) is .412 (through 2022), and he has exceeded the .400 OBP plateau in nine separate seasons. He led the NL in that category seven times (from 2010 to 2013, and 2016 to 2018). Despite posting a .459 OBP in 2015 (second highest of his career), Votto finished second to Bryce Harper's .460 OBP that season. Votto has had three 3-home run games in his MLB career through 2022.

Votto led the league in assists (with 136) for first basemen in 2008, a feat he repeated in consecutive seasons in 2011 and 2012. He finished fifth in 2009 with 101 assists and second in 2010 with 128 assists. In 2011, he also led all NL first basemen in putouts (1,341), and he was third in fielding percentage (.996). That year, he won his first Gold Glove Award.

Personal life
Votto was described in a 2021 profile in The Athletic'' as perhaps "the most interesting man in baseball." Teammates described him as "his own man," "a genius" and "on a different wavelength than most people." He was described on SB Nation as a "magnificent weirdo."

Votto has described himself as an introvert. In 2009, he missed games due to stress and other mental health concerns. He later opened up about having suffered panic attacks, being hospitalized and being diagnosed as depressed. Votto has said that, early in his career, he lacked confidence, was burnt out due to his self-imposed expectations and had no social life.

In 2021, he finished his sophomore year as a geography major at the University of Florida.

In January 2022, he became a United States citizen in a ceremony in the United States District Court for the Southern District of Ohio.

In August 2022, Votto began using social media for the first time to combat feelings of isolation and engage with fans.

Votto has three brothers: Tyler, and twin brothers named Ryan and Paul. Votto had a mastiff-golden retriever mix named "Maris", who was named after former baseball player Roger Maris; the dog died in 2020. Votto is represented by sports agent Dan Lozano.

Votto is an avid chess fan and plays competitive chess tournaments in Toronto.

Career awards and honors

Major leagues

2018 National League All-Star
2018 National League Player of the Week (Week of April 23–29) 
2017 Lou Gehrig Memorial Award
2017 National League Player of the Week (Week of June 26–July 2) 
2017 National League All-Star (Cincinnati)
2017 Lou Marsh Trophy
2017 Tip O'Neill Award
2016 Tip O'Neill Award
2015 Tip O'Neill Award
2013 National League Player of the Week (Week of May 13–19) 
2013 National League All-Star
2013 Tip O'Neill Award
2012 National League All-Star
2012 Tip O'Neill Award
2011 Gold Glove Award (first-base)
2011 National League All-Star
2011 National League Player of the Week (Week of July 25–31) 
2010 National League Most Valuable Player
2010 National League Hank Aaron Award
2010 Ernie Lombardi Award
2010 National League All-Star
2010 Tip O'Neill Award
2010 Lou Marsh Trophy
2010 Syl Apps Athlete of the Year Award, awarded to Ontario's athlete of the year
2009 National League Player of the Week (Week of September 21–27) 
2008 National League Rookie of the Month (September)

Minor leagues
 
2007 INT Post-Season All Star (Louisville)
2007 INT Mid-Season All Star (Louisville)
2007 INT Rookie of the Year (Louisville)
2007 Baseball America Triple-A All Star (Louisville)
2006 Baseball America Double-A All Star (Chattanooga)
2006 SOU Most Valuable Player (Chattanooga)
2006 SOU Mid-Season All Star (Chattanooga)
2006 SOU Post-Season All Star (Chattanooga)

See also

 Cincinnati Reds award winners and league leaders
 List of Major League Baseball annual putouts leaders
 List of Major League Baseball career assists as a first baseman leaders
 List of Major League Baseball career bases on balls leaders
 List of Major League Baseball career hits leaders
 List of Major League Baseball career intentional bases on balls leaders
 List of Major League Baseball career on-base percentage leaders
 List of Major League Baseball career OPS leaders
 List of Major League Baseball career runs batted in leaders
 List of Major League Baseball career slugging percentage leaders
 List of Major League Baseball players from Canada
 Major League Baseball titles leaders
 List of Canadian sports personalities
 List of people from Toronto

References

External links

Joey Votto career statistics from MILB.com
Feature on 1B Joey Votto from MILB.com
Joey Votto News

1983 births
Living people
Baseball players from Toronto
Billings Mustangs players
Canadian expatriate baseball players in the United States
Canadian people of English descent
Canadian people of Italian descent
Chattanooga Lookouts players
Cincinnati Reds players
Dayton Dragons players
Gold Glove Award winners
Gulf Coast Reds players
Leones del Escogido players
Canadian expatriate baseball players in the Dominican Republic
Louisville Bats players
Lou Marsh Trophy winners
Major League Baseball first basemen
Major League Baseball players from Canada
Mesa Solar Sox players
National League All-Stars
National League Most Valuable Player Award winners
Potomac Cannons players
Sarasota Reds players
Sportspeople from Etobicoke
World Baseball Classic players of Canada
2009 World Baseball Classic players
2013 World Baseball Classic players
Naturalized citizens of the United States